The following are lists of 20th Century Studios films by decade:

Lists

Predecessors 
 List of Fox Film films (1915–1935)
  List of Twentieth Century Pictures films (1933–1935)

As Twentieth Century Fox Film Corporation 
 List of 20th Century Fox films (1935–1999)
 List of 20th Century Fox films (2000–2020)

As 20th Century Studios 
 List of 20th Century Studios films (2020–present)

External links 

20th Century Studios
20th Century Studios